Bang Bang Kid is a 1967 Western film produced by Sidney W. Pink and starring Tom Bosley. The film was distributed in America by Troma Entertainment.

Plot
The plot revolves around a madcap inventor who constructs a mechanical gunfighter to fight against a tyrannical crime lord.

References

External links
 

1967 films
1967 comedy films
1960s Western (genre) comedy films
American Western (genre) science fiction films
Films produced by Sidney W. Pink
Films scored by Nico Fidenco
Troma Entertainment films
1960s English-language films
1960s American films